Ateleia may refer to:
 Ateleia, a genus of legumes in the family Fabaceae
 Ateleia (fly), a genus of fungus gnats in the family Mycetophilidae
 Ateleia (ancient Greece), an economic term of Ancient Greece
 Ateleia (musician), an American electronic musician